is a passenger railway station located in the city of Himeji, Hyōgo Prefecture, Japan, operated by the private Sanyo Electric Railway.

Lines

Station layout
The station consists of two ground-level island platforms connected by an elevated station building.

Platforms

History
Ōshio Station opened 19 August 1923. The platform serving tracks 3 and 4 were extended to accommodate 6-car trains in March 2022. Until then, the 6-car long Limited Express trains were stopping with the last car not aligned with the platform.

Passenger statistics
In fiscal 2018, the station was used by an average of 2628 passengers daily (boarding passengers only).

Surrounding area
 Oshio Tenman-gu
Higasayama Park
Himeji City Oshio Elementary School

See also
List of railway stations in Japan

References

External links

 Official website (Sanyo Electric Railway) 

Railway stations in Japan opened in 1923
Railway stations in Himeji